Patrick is a male given name of  Latin origin. It is derived from the Roman name Patricius (patrician, i.e. "father", "nobleman"). The female equivalent is Patricia.

People named Patrick

Actors and entertainers
Pat Condell, English stand-up comedian
Pat Paulsen (1927–1997), American comedian and satirist
Pat Sajak, American game show host
Patrick Armand, French ballet dancer
Patrick Brasca, Canadian-Taiwanese singer
Patrick Cargill, British actor
Patrick Dempsey, American actor
Patrick Duffy, American actor
Patrick Ellis (radio host) (1943–2020), American radio show host
Patrick Gower, New Zealand journalist (Newshub)
Patrick Heusinger, American actor
Patrick J. Adams (born 1981), Canadian actor
Patrick Macnee, English actor
Patrick Magee, Irish actor
Patrick McDonnell, Irish actor
Patrick McGoohan (1928–2009), Irish-American actor
Patrick Monahan, Irish comedian
Patrick O'Connell, Irish actor
Patrick Stewart (born 1940), British actor
Patrick Swayze (1952–2009), American actor
Patrick Tam (actor) (born 1969), Hong Kong actor and singer
Patrick Tang (born 1974), Hong Kong singer, actor, and TV show host
Patrick Topaloff (1944–2010), French singer and actor
Patrick Troughton (1920–1987), English actor
Patrick Tse (born 1936), Hong Kong actor, producer, screenwriter and director
Patrick Warburton (born 1964), American actor
Patrick Waltz (1924–1972), American actor
Patrick Wilson (born 1973), American actor

Other
Sean Patrick Flanery, American actor
Sean Patrick Thomas, American actor
Neil Patrick Harris, American actor

Authors 
 Patrick, the pseudonym used by artist John Byrne (born 1940), Scottish playwright
Patrick Cary (c. 1624–1658), English poet
Pat Chapman, English food writer
Padraic Colum (1881–1972), Irish author
Patrick Cullinan (1932–2011), South African poet and biographer
Patrick Delaforce, historian and British Army captain
Patrick Jennings (born 1962), American children's book author
Patrick Jones (born 1965), Welsh poet and playwright
Patrick Lane (1939–2019), Canadian poet
Patrick Modiano (born 1945), French novelist
Patrick Pearse (1879–1916), Irish poet and nationalist
Patrick O'Brian (1914–2000), English author and translator
Patrick Süskind (born 1949), German writer and screenwriter

Musicians 
 Pat Acuña (born 1986), American drummer, member of indie rock band Silent Old Mtns
Patrick Alavi, German musician
Pat Boone, American singer
Patrick Brasca, Canadian-Taiwanese singer
Patrick Carney (born 1980), American drummer, member of indie rock band The Black Keys
Pat DiNizio (1955–2017), American songwriter, lead singer of the band The Smithereens
Patrick Doyle, film composer
Patrick Girondi, singer, composer
Patrick Hernandez, French singer 
Patrick Lindner, German singer 
Pat Metheny, American jazz guitarist
Steven Patrick Morrissey (born 1959), British singer
Patrick Monahan (born 1969), American musician (rock band Train)
 Patrick "Pat" O'Brien, former lead guitarist for the death metal band Cannibal Corpse,  former member for the heavy metal band Nevermore and a former touring musician with the thrash metal band Slayer
 Patrick Chukwuemeka Okogwu, known as Tinie Tempah, British rapper
Patrick Simmons (born 1948), American guitarist and singer, founding member of the band The Doobie Brothers
Patrick Stump (born 1984), American musician, lead singer and rhythm guitarist of the band Fall Out Boy
Patrick Wilson (born 1969), American musician, drummer of the band Weezer
Patrick Wolf (born 1983), English singer-songwriter

Politicians 
Patrick Dankwa Anin (1928-1999), Ghanaian politician
Patrik Björck (born 1957), Swedish politician
Patrick Blake (1846–1909), Canadian politician
Patrick Boland, Irish politician
Patrick Buchanan, American political commentator, author and politician
Patrick Byrne, Irish politician
Patrick Connor, Irish politician
Patrick Donnelly, Irish politician
Patrick Duffy, Irish politician
Patrik Engström (born 1968), Swedish politician
Patrick F. Gill, American Representative
Patrick Henry (1736–1799), American revolutionary figure
Patrick Hetzel (born 1964), French Member of Parliament
Patrick Hillery (1923–2008), the sixth President of Ireland (1976–1990)
Patrick J. Kennedy, former United States congressman
Patrick Leonard, Irish politician
Patrik Lundqvist (born 1984), Swedish politician
Patrick Matibini (born 1959), Zambian politician and judge / current speaker of the national assembly 'parliament'
Patrick Murphy, Irish politician
Patrick Norton, Irish politician
Patrick Palmer, Irish politician
Patrick Pearse (aka Pádraig Pearse) (1879–1916), Irish activist and revolutionary
Pat Roberts, American Senator from Kansas
Pat Robertson, American preacher and political figure
Patrick Lipton Robinson, Jamaican U.N. judge
Patrick Tierney, Irish politician
Patrick Vans, Scottish judge
Patrick Vanse (1655–1733), Scottish MP
Levy Patrick Mwanawasa (1948-2008), Former President of the Republic of Zambia

Religious figures 
Saint Patrick, Christian saint
Patrick Duggan (bishop), Roman Catholic Bishop of Clonfert in Ireland

Sportspeople
 Patrick, the working name of professional wrestler Don Harris
Patrik Andersson, Swedish football player
Patrick Baldassarre (born 1986), Swiss basketball player
Patrick Bamford, English football player
Pat Barry (born 1979), American kickboxer and mixed martial artist
Pat Batteaux (born 1978), American football player
Patrick Battiston (born 1957), French footballer 
Patrik Berger, Czech football player
Patrik Berglund, Swedish ice hockey player
Pat Boller (born 1972), American ice hockey coach and executive
Paddy Bradley, Irish Gaelic football player
Patrick Burris, American judoka and two-time Olympian
Patrick Cain, American football player
Pat Calathes (born 1985), Greek-American basketball player
Pat Cash, Australian tennis player
Patrick Chan (born 1990), Canadian figure skater
Patrick Chung, American football player
Patrick Dangerfield, Australian football player
Patrick Eaves, American-Canadian ice hockey player
Pat Elflein, American football player
Pat Elzie, American-German basketball coach and former player
Patrick Ewing, American basketball player
Patrick Faber (field hockey), Dutch field hockey player
Patrick Fernandes (born 1993), Cape Verdean footballer
Pat Freiermuth (born 1998), American football player
Patrik Gunnarsson (born 2000), Icelandic footballer
Pádraig Harrington, Irish professional golfer
Patrick Heuscher, Swiss volleyball player
Patric Hörnqvist, Swedish ice hockey player
Patrekur Jóhannesson, Icelandic handball coach
Patrick Kane, professional ice hockey player
Patrick Kluivert, Dutch football player
Patrick Kühl, German swimmer
Patrik Kühnen, German tennis player
Patrik Laine, Finnish ice hockey player
Patrick Laird (born 1995), American football player
Patrick Lam (born 1983), Hong Kong equestrian
Patrick Larkins (1860–1918), American baseball player
Patrick Lewis, American football player
Pat Mahomes, American baseball player; father of Patrick Mahomes II
Patrick Mahomes II, American football player
Patrick Matt, Liechtensteiner cyclist
Pat Matzdorf, American athlete
Patrick Mazeika (born 1993), American baseball player
Patrick Mboma (born 1970), Cameroonian football player
Pat McAfee (born 1987), American football player and Sports analyst
Patrick McEnroe, American tennis player
Patrick McGuirk (born 1967), American football player
Patrick Mekari (born 1997), American football player
Patrick Miller (basketball) (born 1992), American basketball player in the Israeli Basketball Premier League
Patty Mills, Australian basketball player←
Patrick Morris (American football) (born 1995), American football player
Pat Mountain, Welsh football player
Patrick O'Connell (1887–1959), Irish footballer
Pat O'Connor (disambiguation), multiple people
Pat O'Hanlon (born 1991), Australia Rugby League player
Patrick Owomoyela (born 1979), German footballer
Patrick Pedersen (born 1991), Danish footballer
Patrick Queen (born 1999), American football player
Patrick Rafter, Australian tennis player
Patrick Rakovsky, German football player
Patrick Ramsey, American football player
Patrick Ricard (American football) (born 1994), American football player
Pat Richards (born 1981), Australian Rugby League player
Patrick Rowe (born 1969), American football player
Patrick Roy, Canadian ice hockey goaltender
Pat Ryan (born 1955), American football player
Patrick Sandoval, American baseball player
Patrick Scales (American football), American football player
Patrick Schmollinger, Austrian swimmer
Patrick da Silva, Brazilian football player
Patrik Sjöberg, Swedish high jumper
Pat Spillane, Irish Gaelic footballer
Patrick Surtain (born 1976), American football player
Patrick Surtain II (born 2000), American football player
Pat Tillman (born 1976), American football player and Army Ranger
Patrick Vahe (born 1996), American football player
Patrick Veszpremi, Australian rules footballer
Patrick Vieira, Senegalese-born French football player
Patrik Virta (born 1996), Finnish ice hockey player
Patrick Willis (born 1985), American football player

Other
H.I.H. Prince Patrick Ali of Iran
Patrick Abercrombie, English town planner 
Patrick Bokanowski, a French filmmaker
Patrick Tracy Burris (1967–2009), American spree killer
Patrick Carr (disambiguation), multiple people
Patrick Critton, American former teacher and the first successful aircraft hijacker 
Patrick E. Crago, American medical researcher
Patrick Wood Crusius (born 1998), suspect in the 2019 El Paso shooting
Patrick Degorce (born 1969), French hedge fund manager
Pat Finucane (1949–1989), Irish lawyer 
Patrick Fitzgerald, American Attorney
Patrick Flanagan, American inventor
Patrick Gaffney (disambiguation), multiple people
Patrik Gardesten, Swedish officer
Patrick de Gayardon (1960–1998), French skydiver, skysurfer and BASE jumper
Patrick Gordon, Imperial Russian Army general
Patrick Graham (disambiguation), multiple people
Patrick Harvey (disambiguation), multiple people
Patrick Hitler, half-nephew of Adolf Hitler
Patrick Jeffrey, American diver
Patrick Kearney (born 1939), prolific American serial killer, rapist, and necrophile
Pat Kenny, Irish broadcaster
Patrick Kielty, Irish comedian and television presenter
Pat Kiernan, television news anchor
Patrick Kong, Hong Kong film director and screenwriter
Patrick Lee (Chinese businessman), Chinese business magnate
Patrick Anson, 5th Earl of Lichfield (1939–2005; also known as Patrick Lichfield), photographer
Patrick Lin (chef), Hong Kong Senior Executive Chef 
Patrick Lin (cinematographer), Hong Kong–born cinematographer and layout artist
Patrick Lung (1934-2014), Hong Kong film director 
Patrick Lynch (disambiguation), multiple people
Patrick Mackay (born 1952), British serial killer 
Patrick McGuinness (disambiguation), multiple people
Sir Patrick Moore, English astronomer
Patrick Moore (born 1947), founder member of Greenpeace
Patrick Nogueira, Brazilian murderer serving three life sentences plus 25 years in Spain
Patrick Russell (disambiguation), multiple people
Patrick Rechner, Canadian Captain taken hostage working as a UN observer in Bosnia
Patrick "Spaz" Spaziante, American comic book artist
Patrick Swift (1927–1983), painter
Patrick Tam (film director) (born 1948), Hong Kong film director and film editor
Patrick Whelan (1893–1916), Irish Volunteer, KIA during the Easter Rising of 1916
Patrick Taylor (disambiguation), multiple people
Patrick Theodore (born 1985), Footwear Designer (Indonesian)
Patrick Williams (disambiguation), multiple people
Patrick Yau, Hong Kong film director and assistant director

Fictional characters
Lord Harry, also known as Patrick, the locomotive character from The Railway Series books by the Rev. W. Awdry
Patrick, an Irish chip shop owner played by David Mullane in the British web series Corner Shop Show
Patrick Bateman in Bret Easton Ellis' novel American Psycho
Patrick Darling in Dirty Sexy Money
Sir Patrick Delaney-Podmore in the Harry Potter series of books
Patrick Harper (fiction), the Irish right-hand man in the Sharpe book and television series
Patrick Jane, main character in The Mentalist
Paddy Kirk popular character in the Yorkshire-based soap opera Emmerdale.
Patrick McKinney in the Netflix television series Stranger Things.
 Patrick O'Malley, main character in the video game series Delicious
Patrick Star in the television series SpongeBob SquarePants
 Patrick Verona, main character in 10 Things I Hate About You

See also
Pádraigín, Irish given name
Patrick (disambiguation)
Patrick (surname)

English masculine given names
French masculine given names
Irish masculine given names
German masculine given names